

All–time record against all nations
As of 12 January 2023

This is a list of Icelandic national team complete records, both friendlies and competitive matches, as reported on.  Countries that are in italics are not members of FIFA or are former countries.

References

head to head